Viravada railway station is a railway station on Ahmedabad–Udaipur Line under the Ajmer railway division of North Western Railway zone. This is situated at Vantada, Modasa in Sabarkantha district of the Indian state of Gujarat.

References

Ajmer railway division
Railway stations in Sabarkantha district